The Men's time trial C5 road cycling event at the 2016 Summer Paralympics took place on 14 September at Flamengo Park, Pontal. Fourteen riders from twelve nations competed.

The C5 category is for cyclists with least impairment, including single amputation and minimal neurological dysfunction.

Results

References

Men's road time trial C5